The Coulee Conference is a seven-member high school athletic conference in the La Crosse, Wisconsin area. It is affiliated with the Wisconsin Interscholastic Athletic Association. Conference schools have enrollments ranging from 236 to 540, with an average enrollment of 395.

Beginning in 2014, West Salem will compete in the Mississippi Valley Conference for football only.

With the announcement and passing of football-only conference realignments by the WIAA, the Coulee Conference will be temporarily split up for the 2019 football season. In the 2020 football season, the Coulee Conference will return, but Luther will join the Scenic Bluffs Conference. The Altoona Railroaders of the Cloverbelt Conference and Aquinas Blugolds (La Crosse) of the Mississippi Valley Conference will join the Coulee for football only.

Sports
The Coulee Conference sponsors 20 varsity sports.  They are:

 Fall - Football, boys' soccer, girls' tennis, volleyball, boys' cross country, girls' cross country and girls' golf
 Winter - Boys' basketball, girls' basketball, gymnastics, wrestling boys' hockey and girls' hockey.
 Spring - Boys' track, girls' track, boys' golf, boys' tennis, girls' soccer, baseball and softball.

Schools

Former schools
Holmen Vikings (Holmen) - Left after 1988 season to join Mississippi Valley Conference
Onalaska Hilltoppers (Onalaska) - Left after 1988 season to join Mississippi Valley Conference
La Crescent Lancers (La Crescent, Minnesota) - Left after 2006 season to join Minnesota's Hiawatha Valley League
Melrose-Mindoro Mustangs (Melrose)
Cochrane-Fountain City Pirates (Fountain City)

State championships

Football
1978 - Westby
1985 - Westby
1986 - Westby
2007 - West Salem

Boys' golf
1994 - Galesville-Ettrick-Trempealeau
2010 - Arcadia

Softball
2014 - Arcadia

Boys' Track & Field
1991 - Arcadia
1992 - Arcadia
1994 - Arcadia
1995 - Arcadia
1998 - Arcadia
1999 - Arcadia
2004 - Arcadia

Girls' Track & Field
1979 - West Salem
1998 - Arcadia
2003 - Arcadia
2004 - Arcadia
2007 - West Salem
2008 - Arcadia
2009 - Arcadia

Spring Baseball
2017 - West Salem

State championship runners-up

Football
1989 - Westby
1999 - Black River Falls
2002 - West Salem
2005 - West Salem
2009 - Arcadia

Boys' basketball
2006 - Westby
2012 - Gale-Ettrick-Trempealeau

Girls' basketball
1999 - Viroqua

Spring baseball
1981 - Viroqua
1985 - Viroqua
1997 - Westby
2013 - Westby
2014- Viroqua

Summer baseball
1984 - Galesville-Ettrick-Trempealeau

Boys' cross country
1994 - West Salem

Girls' golf
2008 - Arcadia/Cochrane-Fountain City

Boys' golf
1991 - Arcadia
1996 - Arcadia
1999 - Arcadia

Gymnastics
1979 - Viroqua
2004 - Galesville-Ettrick-Trempealeau/Melrose-Mindoro/Cochrane-Fountain City
2005 - Galesville-Ettrick-Trempealeau/Melrose-Mindoro/Cochrane-Fountain City

Girls' hockey
2002 - Viroqua/Cornerstone/Westby/Youth Initiative

Boys' Track & Field
1973 - West Salem
2001 - Arcadia
2007 - Arcadia
2009 - West Salem

Girls' Track & Field
2008 - West Salem
2009 - West Salem

Softball
1991 - Westby
2007 - Arcadia

Wrestling
1995 - Arcadia

The Vernon County Mega Bowl
Beginning in 2019, the Westby Norsemen and the Viroqua Blackhawks have played for the Vernon County Mega Bowl in their yearly football contest. The Norsemen won the first Mega Bowl game 21-8 in 2019. There was no Mega Bowl Game in 2020.

Mega Bowl Game results

References

External links
Official website

Education in La Crosse County, Wisconsin
Wisconsin high school sports conferences
High school sports conferences and leagues in the United States